The 2003 Nokia Brier was held at the Halifax Metro Centre in Halifax, Nova Scotia from March 1–9.  The defending champion, Randy Ferbey and his team from Alberta were the winners, winning their third Brier in a row. At the Worlds they went  on to represent Canada and win the gold medal.

Teams

Round-robin standings

Round-robin results
All draw times are listed in Atlantic Standard Time (UTC−4).

Draw 1
Saturday, March 1, 3:00 pm

Draw 2
Saturday, March 1, 8:00 pm

Draw 3
Sunday, March 2, 9:00 am

Draw 4
Sunday, March 2, 3:00 pm

Draw 5
Sunday, March 2, 8:00 pm

Draw 6
Monday, March 3, 9:00 am

Draw 7
Monday, March 3, 3:00 pm

Draw 8
Monday, March 3, 8:00 pm

Draw 9
Tuesday, March 4, 9:00 am

Draw 10
Tuesday, March 4, 3:00 pm

Draw 11
Tuesday, March 4, 8:00 pm

Draw 12
Wednesday, March 5, 9:00 am

Draw 13
Wednesday, March 5, 3:00 pm

Draw 14
Wednesday, March 5, 8:00 pm

Draw 15
Thursday, March 6, 9:00 am

Draw 16
Thursday, March 6, 3:00 pm

Draw 17
Thursday, March 6, 8:00 pm

Playoffs

3 vs. 4
Friday, March 7, 3:00 pm

1 vs. 2
Friday, March 7, 8:00 pm

Semifinal
Saturday, March 8, 2:30 pm

Final
Sunday, March 9, 7:00 pm

Statistics

Top 5 player percentages
Round Robin only

Team percentages
Round Robin only

External links
2003 Nokia Brier Statistical Summary

Nokia Brier, 2003
2003
Nokia Brier
2003 in Nova Scotia
March 2003 sports events in Canada